

Sultana Point is a locality in the Australian state of South Australia located on the Yorke Peninsula immediately adjoining the western head of Gulf St Vincent about  west of the state capital of Adelaide.

Its boundaries were created in November 2011 in response to a request from the then District Council of the Yorke Peninsula to “formally recognise this long established community.”  The locality is bounded to the north by Hilsea Road and by Wattle Bay Road to the west.

At the 2016 census, the locality shared  a population of 516  with the adjoining locality of Edithburgh .

Sultana Point is located within the federal division of Grey, the state electoral district of Narungga and the local government area of the Yorke Peninsula Council.

See also
List of cities and towns in South Australia
Sultana (disambiguation)

References
Notes

Citations

Towns in South Australia
Gulf St Vincent
Yorke Peninsula